A Little Taste is an album by jazz organist Johnny "Hammond" Smith which was recorded in 1963 and released on the Riverside label.

Reception

The Allmusic site awarded the album 3 stars and its review by Richie Unterberger calls it "a sturdy quartet date... There's more of a straight jazz (as opposed to soul-jazz) influence on this than on some other Smith sessions of the time".

Track listing
All compositions by Johnny "Hammond" Smith except as indicated
 "Nica's Dream" (Horace Silver) - 5:28  
 "Cleopatra and the African Knight" - 6:23  
 "Bennie's Diggin'" - 4:24  
 "Brake Through" - 4:35  
 "Eloise" - 3:54 
 "A Little Taste" (Cannonball Adderley) - 4:33  
 "Twixt the Sheets" - 4:12

Personnel
Johnny "Hammond" Smith - organ
Virgil Jones - trumpet
Houston Person — tenor saxophone 
Luis Taylor - drums

References

1963 albums
Johnny "Hammond" Smith albums
Riverside Records albums
Albums produced by Orrin Keepnews